Kazimierz Rymut (18 December 1935 in Chechły near Ropczyce - 14 November 2006 in Kraków) was a Polish linguist. His area of expertise was the etymology of towns and geographical features in Poland.

References
Short obituary in English
Kazimierz Rymut  (1935 – 2006), Aleksandra Cieślikowa, Instytut Języka Polskiego PAN w Krakowie.

1935 births
2006 deaths
Linguists from Poland
Etymologists
20th-century linguists
Jagiellonian University alumni
People from Ropczyce-Sędziszów County